Cocina may refer to:
 Cocina (magazine)
 Playa de la Cocina, a beach in Spain